Teenage Mutant Ninja Turtles 3: Mutant Nightmare is a video game published by Konami for the PlayStation 2, GameCube, Xbox, and Nintendo DS, based on the 2003 Teenage Mutant Ninja Turtles TV series.

The game is divided into four sections, called "Episodes" (one is unlocked at the third Episode's conclusion): Space Invaders, dealing with the third season opening arcs Space Invaders and Worlds Collide; Bishop's Gambit, based on both the eponymous episode of the third season, and featuring antagonists from two other episodes; Exodus, detailing the events of New Blood and the Exodus two-parter; and finally The Nightmare, based on the five episodes in which Ultimate Drako separated the Turtles and Splinter across different dimensions.

After competing episode 1 in Teenage Mutant Ninja Turtles: 3 Mutant Nightmare, the player will unlock a slightly altered version of the arcade game, Teenage Mutant Ninja Turtles: Turtles in Time, which is a 1991 TMNT game also developed by Konami. This is also the final game in the series to be produced and distributed by Konami, until the Teenage Mutant Ninja Turtles: The Cowabunga Collection in 2022.

Plot
In Episode 1, the Turtles begin saving an old person in New York City from the sadistic Triceratons. After destroying three carriers deploying the Triceraton army, the Turtles go underground to reach Central Park to rescue their friends Casey Jones and April O'Neil. While in the park, Leo, Ralph, Mikey and Don defend against the Triceratons and Professor Honeycutt pegged as the Fugitoid saved from TMNT 2 Battle Nexus assists the turtles in finding where Casey Jones and April O'Neil are held captive. Breaking into the Triceraton's base, Zanramon, commander in chief of the Triceraton's mobilizes a robot in effort of stopping the Turtles and Traximus. Zaranmon's attempt is a failure and Traximus destroys a chair to make change in their clan.

In Episode 2, the turtles discover new technology coming from Baxter Stockman as Mousers infiltrate the sewer causing intense pain to the ears of Master Splinter. While protecting their sensei, the ninja turtles are fending off the Mousers while staying close to him. However, Master Splinter ends up being captured and the turtles use hoverboards to chase down a moving van. They are soon blocked by a tall and small enemy duo for an ambush. Once passed them, the turtles resume in their rescue mission for Master Splinter eventually fighting with Bishop then having to use throwing stars to break a lock to free him.

In Episode 3, the Turtles encounter every member of the Foot Clan through the missions. Hun, Karai, and Oroku Saki, the human identity of Shredder all fall down to the turtles. Towards the final battle with Saki, he is upgraded as Exo Shredder. The ninja turtles defeat him and then are summoned upon the Utrom council for a tribunal. Ch'rell, the Utrom controlling Shredder's body is charged for devious crimes and is exiled to an icy asteroid called Mor Gal Tal while Karai and the others are turned into the authorities as the main game ends.

In the Nightmare chapter, each of the turtles have a dream and encounter various bosses. Clearing most of the missions in this chapter leads to the game's final boss, Ultimate Drako. To use the gembu scrolls to activate the Ultimate Turtle forms, the player must collect scrolls and other content in Free Battle mode.

Reception

Sales
The game sold 1.5 million copies by 2007.

References

External links

2005 video games
Action video games
Konami beat 'em ups
PlayStation 2 games
Windows games
Nintendo DS games
Platform games
Shoot 'em ups
Xbox games
GameCube games
Mutant Nightmare
Video games developed in Japan
Cooperative video games
Video games with cel-shaded animation
Video game sequels
Video games set in New York City
3D platform games